Fregenal de la Sierra (originally Frexnal or Frexenal) is a municipality located in the province of Badajoz, Extremadura, Spain.

Geography 
Fregenal de la Sierra is located in the Sierra Suroeste comarca (county), among the small hills and ravines of the Sierra Morena. Fregenal de la Sierra borders Valverde de Burguillos, Burguillos del Cerro and Jerez de los Caballeros to the north, Valencia del Ventoso to the east, Bodonal de la Sierra, Segura de León and Fuentes de León to the south, and Higuera la Real to the southwest. It is the seat of the Fregenal de la Sierra judicial district (partido judicial).   Fregenal is located on the EX-101, EX-201, and N-435 highways and is served by rail (on the daily Zafra-Huelva line) and by bus.

Economy
Fregenal de la Sierra's economy has traditionally depended on agriculture and livestock.  To a lesser extent, mining has also been important; it was important as a distribution point for minerals mined in the surrounding areas. Today major industries include cork extraction and the processing of pork from Iberian pigs. Tourism is also increasing in importance.

History
In the vicinity of the present town lie the ruins (almost entirely buried and little-researched) of a Celtic fort called Nertóbriga, which became known as Nertóbriga-Concordia Iulia after the Roman conquest. This city was part of the Hispania Ulterior region in the first two centuries BC; later it became part of Hispania Baetica, where it remained for over seven centuries until the beginning of the Muslim conquest.  New research in this city has uncovered a watchtower first used by the Visigoths and later by Muslims, and a Muslim cemetery. The only reference made by Christians about this city is the name Castillo de Valera, which was dated by the Knights Templar.

The city was conquered by Fernando III with the help of the Templars, but first appearance of Fregenal in historical records was in 1283 when the population was given by Alfonso X of Castile to the Order of the Temple for its work in the reconquista. Fregenal ultimately was returned to the kingdom of Seville in 1312.

Over 100 individuals from Fregenal traveled to the New World during Spanish conquest and colonization, among them Alonso Rodríguez Santos and Benito Arias Montano (son of Rodríguez Santos and nephew of the humanist also named Benito Arias Montano). Spanish actress Pilar López de Ayala's (b. 1978) father Rodrigo López de Ayala Sánchez-Arjona (b. 1944) was born here, from descendants of Christopher Columbus.

Twin towns

 Barrancos, Portugal
 Taurisano, Italy

Photo gallery

References

Municipalities in the Province of Badajoz